Robert Engels (born 1949) is an American born writer, producer, and director as well as being a professor of screenwriting at Cal State Fullerton.

Biography
He graduated from Saint John's Preparatory School in Collegeville, Minn. in 1967. He wrote several episodes of and produced Twin Peaks and also co-wrote the 1992 film Twin Peaks: Fire Walk with Me. He is also credited with writing and producing several other television series, such as seaQuest DSV and Gene Roddenberry's Andromeda. In 1993, he was nominated (with David Lynch) for a Saturn Award for best writing, for his work on Twin Peaks: Fire Walk with Me. His only on screen appearances (so far) have been on seaQuest during its first season as Malcolm Lansdowne.

Filmography
Writer
Wiseguy (3 episodes) (1990)
Twin Peaks (10 episodes) (1990-1991)
Twin Peaks: Fire Walk with Me (1992) (written by)
On the Air (3 episodes) (1992)
Sirens (1 episode) (1993)
seaQuest DSV (2 episodes) (1994)
The Adventures of Sinbad (2 episodes) (1997)
Murder in Small Town X (unknown episodes) (2001)
Matthew Blackheart: Monster Smasher (2002) (creator)
Andromeda (8 episodes) (2002-2005)
Greenleaf (1 episode) (2016)

Producer
Twin Peaks (co-producer) (1990)
On the Air (co-executive producer) (1992)
seaQuest DSV (co-executive producer) (Season 1) (1993-1994)
Andromeda (executive producer) (2002-2005)

Actor
seaQuest DSV .... Malcolm Lansdowne (3 episodes) (1993-1994)

References

External links

California State University, Fullerton College of Communications, Department of Radio Television Film Faculty

1949 births
Living people
American film directors
American television writers
American male television writers
American television producers
California State University, Fullerton faculty
Officers of the Order of Merit of the Grand Duchy of Luxembourg
Screenwriters from California